David Ledger is an Indian politician. He was a Member of Parliament, representing Assam in the Rajya Sabha the upper house of India's Parliament as a member of the  Indian National Congress.

References

Rajya Sabha members from Assam
Indian National Congress politicians from Assam
1951 births
Living people